Carlina lanata is a species of plant in the family Asteraceae.

Sources

References 

lanata
Flora of Malta